Reference Re Senate Reform was a reference question to the Supreme Court of Canada regarding the constitutional validity of proposals to change the Senate, such as term limits, consultative elections, and abolition. The ruling was announced April 2014, following arguments made in November 2013. The court decided that term limits and consultative elections could not be done by the Federal Government alone through Parliament, but also required the consent of seven provinces representing more than 50% of the population, in accordance with the lower of two thresholds for the constitutional amending formula. The court also ruled that Senate abolishment would require the higher threshold for amendment: Parliamentary approval plus consent of all ten provinces.

See also
List of Supreme Court of Canada cases (McLachlin Court)

References

External links
 Supreme Court Decision

Supreme Court of Canada reference question cases
2014 in Canadian case law